BoPET (biaxially-oriented polyethylene terephthalate) is a polyester film made from stretched polyethylene terephthalate (PET) and is used for its high tensile strength, chemical and dimensional stability, transparency, reflectivity, gas and aroma barrier properties, and electrical insulation. A variety of companies manufacture boPET and other polyester films under different brand names. In the UK and US, the best-known trade names are Mylar, Melinex, and Hostaphan.

History 
BoPET film was developed in the mid-1950s, originally by DuPont, Imperial Chemical Industries (ICI), and Hoechst.

In 1953 Buckminster Fuller used Mylar as a skin for a geodesic dome, which he built with students at the University of Oregon.

In 1955 Eastman Kodak used Mylar as a support for photographic film and called it "ESTAR Base". The very thin and tough film allowed  reels to be exposed on long-range U-2 reconnaissance flights.

Manufacture and properties 

The manufacturing process begins with a film of molten polyethylene terephthalate (PET) being extruded onto a chill roll, which quenches it into the amorphous state. It is then biaxially oriented by drawing. The most common way of doing this is the sequential process, in which the film is first drawn in the machine direction using heated rollers and subsequently drawn in the transverse direction, i.e. orthogonally to the direction of travel, in a heated oven. It is also possible to draw the film in both directions simultaneously, although the equipment required for this is somewhat more elaborate. Draw ratios are typically around 3 to 4 in each direction.

Once the drawing is completed, the film is "heat set" or crystallized under tension in the oven at temperatures typically above . The heat setting step prevents the film from shrinking back to its original unstretched shape and locks in the molecular orientation in the film plane. Another important consequence of the molecular orientation is that it induces the formation of many crystal nuclei. The crystallites that grow rapidly reach the boundary of the neighboring crystallite and remain smaller than the wavelength of visible light. As a result, biaxially oriented PET film has excellent clarity, despite its semicrystalline structure.

If it were produced without any additives, the surface of the film would be so smooth that layers would adhere strongly to one another when the film is wound up, similar to the sticking of clean glass plates when stacked. To make handling possible, microscopic inert inorganic particles, such as silicon dioxide, are usually embedded in the PET to roughen the surface of the film.

Biaxially oriented PET film can be metallized by vapor deposition of a thin film  of evaporated aluminium, gold, or other metal onto it. The result is much less permeable to gases (important in food packaging) and reflects up to 99% of light, including much of the infrared spectrum. For some applications like food packaging, the aluminized boPET film can be laminated with a layer of polyethylene, which provides sealability and improves puncture resistance. The polyethylene side of such a laminate appears dull and the boPET side shiny.

Other coatings, such as conductive indium tin oxide (ITO), can be applied to boPET film by sputter deposition.

Applications 

Uses for boPET polyester films include, but are not limited to:

Flexible packaging and food contact 
 Laminates containing metallized boPET foil (in technical language called printin or laminate web substrate) protect food against oxidation and aroma loss, achieving long shelf life. Examples are coffee "foil" packaging and pouches for convenience foods.
Pop-Tarts are sold in pairs wrapped in silver boPET. They were previously wrapped in foil.
 White boPET web substrate is used as lidding for dairy goods such as yogurt.
 Clear boPET web substrate is used as lidding for fresh or frozen ready meals. Due to its excellent heat resistance, it can remain on the package during microwave or oven heating.
 Roasting bags
 Metallised films
 Laminated sheet metal (aluminium or steel) used in the manufacture of cans (bisphenol A-free alternative to lacquers)

Covering over paper
 A clear overlay on a map, on which notations, additional data, or copied data, can be drawn without damaging the map
 Metallized boPET is used as a mirror-like decorative surface on some book covers, T-shirts, and other flexible cloths.
 Protective covering over buttons/pins/badges
 The glossy top layer of a Polaroid SX-70 photographic print
 As a backing for very fine sandpaper
 boPET film is used in bagging comic books, in order to best protect them during storage from environmental conditions (moisture, heat, and cold) that would otherwise cause paper to slowly deteriorate over time. This material is used for archival quality storage of documents by the Library of Congress (Mylar® type D, ICI Melinex 516 or equivalent) and several major library comic book research collections, including the Comic Art Collection at Michigan State University.  While boPET is widely (and effectively) used in this archival sense, it is not immune to the effects of fire and heat and could potentially melt, depending on the intensity of the heat source, causing further damage to the encased item.
 Similarly, trading card decks (such as Pokémon, Magic: The Gathering, and Yu-Gi-Oh!) are packaged in pouches or sleeves made of metallized boPET. It can also be used to make the holographic artwork featured on some cards, typically known as "holos", "foils", "shinies", or "holofoils".
For protecting the spine of important documents, such as medical records.

Insulating material
 An electrical insulating material
 Insulation for houses and tents, reflecting thermal radiation
 Five layers of metallized boPET film in NASA's spacesuits make them radiation resistant and help regulate temperature.
 Metallized boPET film emergency blankets conserve a shock victim's body heat.
 As a thin strip to form an airtight seal between the control surfaces and adjacent structure of aircraft, especially gliders.
 Light insulation for indoor gardening.
 Aluminized proximity suits used by fire fighters for protection from the high amount of heat release from fuel fires.
 Used in sock and glove liners to lock in warmth

Solar, marine and aviation
 Metallized boPET is intended to be used for solar sails as an alternative means of propulsion for spacecraft such as Cosmos 1
 Translucent Mylar film, as wide as 48" and in up to 12' in length, found widespread use as a non-dimensional engineering drawing media in the aerospace industry due to its dimensional stability (also see Printing Media section below). This allows production and engineering staff to lay manufactured parts directly over or under the drawing film in order to verify the fidelity of part profiles, hole locations and other part features.
 Metallized boPET solar curtains reflect sunlight and heat away from windows.
 Aluminized, as an inexpensive solar eclipse viewer, although care must be taken, because invisible fissures can form in the metal film, reducing its effectiveness.
 High performance sails for sailboats, hang gliders, paragliders and kites
 Use boPET films as the back face of the PV modules in solar panels
 Metallized boPET as a reflector material for solar cooking stoves
 To bridge control surface gaps on sailplanes (gliders), reducing profile drag

Science
 Amateur and professional visual and telescopic solar filters. BoPET films are often annealed to a glass element to improve thermal conductivity, and guarantee the necessary flat surface needed for even telescopic solar observation.
 Films in annular ring mounts on gas-tight cells, will readily deform into spherical mirrors. Photomultiplier cosmic-ray observatories often make use of these mirrors for inexpensive large (1.0 m and above), lightweight mirror surfaces for sky-sector low and medium energy cosmic ray research.
 As a light diaphragm material separating gases in hypersonic shock and expansion tube facilities.
 As a beamsplitter in Fourier transform infrared spectroscopy, typically with laser applications. Film thicknesses are often in the 500 micrometre range.
 Coating around hematocrit tubes.
 Insulating material for a cryocooler radiation shield.
 As a window material to confine gas in detectors and targets in nuclear physics.
 In CT scanners it acts as a physical barrier between the X-ray tube, detector ring and the patient allowing negligible attenuation of the X-ray beam when active.
 Spacecraft are insulated with a metallized BoPET film.
 The descent stage of the Apollo Lunar Module was covered with BoPET to control the temperature of equipment for lunar exploration carried in the Modular Equipment Stowage Assembly.

Electronic and acoustic
 Carrier for flexible printed circuits.
 BoPET film is often used as the diaphragm material in headphones, electrostatic loudspeakers and microphones.
 BoPET film has been used in the production of banjos and drumheads since 1958 due to its durability and acoustical properties when stretched over the bearing edge of the drum. They are made in single- and double-ply versions, with each ply being  in thickness, with a transparent or opaque surface, originally used by the company Evans.
 BoPET film is used as the substrate in practically all magnetic recording tapes and floppy disks.
 Metallized boPET film, along with other plastic films, is used as a dielectric in foil capacitors.
 Clear boPET bags are used as packaging for audio media such as compact discs and vinyl records.
 Clear and white boPET films are used as core layers and overlays in smart cards.

Printing media
 Before the widespread adoption of computer aided design (CAD), engineering drawings or architectural drawings were plotted onto sheets of boPET film, known as drafting film. The boPET sheets become legal documents from which copies or blueprints are made. boPET sheets are more durable and can withstand more handling than bond paper. Although "blueprint" duplication has fallen out of use, mylar is still used for its archival properties, typically as a record set of plans for building departments to keep on file.
 Overhead transparency film for photocopiers or laser printers (boPET film withstands the high heat).
 Modern lithography printing plates aka "Pronto Plates" (boPET resists oil)

Other
 Balloons, metallic balloons
 Route information signs, called rollsigns or destination blinds, displayed by public transport vehicles
 For materials in kites
 Covering glass to decrease probability of shattering
 In theatre effects such as confetti
 As the adhesive strip to attach the string to a teabag
 One of the many materials used as windsavers or valves for valved harmonicas
 On farmland and domestic gardens, highly reflective aluminized PET film ribbons are used to keep birds away from plants
 Measuring tape
 Protecting pinball machine playfields from wear
 Used in dentistry when restoring teeth with composite
 In nail polish, as a coloured and finely shredded additive to create a glitter effect
 NumismaticsStoring coins for long periods of time. PVC was previously used for this, but over long periods of time PVC can release chlorine, which reacts with the silver and copper in coins. BoPET does not have this problem.
 In fishing fly tying, metallized Mylar strips are sometimes wound around the hook shank for reflective striping or shimmer in certain patterns.

See also
Kapton

References

External links 
 History of Polymers & Plastics for Teachers. by The American Chemistry Council (HTML format) or (PDF format) - 1.9MB, which includes the "chasing arrow" recycling symbols (PET is #1) and a description of plastics.
 An interesting toy has been developed using boPET and a stick-shaped Van de Graaff generator.

Dielectrics
Plastics
Polyesters
Reflective building components
Packaging materials
Terephthalate esters